The Swiss national championship in ice hockey has been contested in various forms since 1909.

History
The Swiss National Championship was first contested in 1909, and continued until 1937, when it was replaced by the Nationalliga A. Due to World War I, it was not contested in the 1914 and 1915 seasons.

Between 1916 and 1933, alongside the Swiss National Championship, the Swiss International Championship was contested. Unlike the National Championship, which had restrictions on the number of foreigners allowed to play, an unlimited number of foreign players were allowed to compete in the International Championship.

Since the 1937-38 season, the Nationalliga A, now called the National League A, is established as the highest level league in Switzerland. In the 1985-86 season, the Swiss Champion was first awarded in the playoffs.

The women's national championship has been contested annually since 1987. The league is known as the Leistungsklasse A. It is also known as Swiss Women’s Hockey League A.

Swiss champions (men's)

National Championship (1909–1937)

International Championship (1916–1933)

Nationalliga A (1938–2007)

National League A (since 2008) 
 2008: ZSC Lions
 2009: HC Davos
 2010: SC Bern
 2011: HC Davos
 2012: ZSC Lions
 2013: SC Bern
 2014: ZSC Lions
 2015: HC Davos
 2016: SC Bern
 2017: SC Bern
 2018: ZSC Lions
 2019: SC Bern

Titles by club

Swiss Cup winners (men's) 
 1957: HC Neuchâtel Young Sprinters
 1958: HC Neuchâtel Young Sprinters
 1959: Genève-Servette HC
 1960: ZSC Lions
 1961: ZSC Lions
 1962: HC Ambrì-Piotta
 1963: HC Neuchâtel Young Sprinters
 1964: EHC Visp
 1965: SC Bern
 1966: Grasshopper Club Zürich
 1972: Genève-Servette HC
 2015: SC Bern
 2016: ZSC Lions
 2017: EHC Kloten
 2018: SC Rapperswil-Jona Lakers
 2019: EV Zug

Swiss champions (women's)

Leistungsklasse A

Titles by club

Swiss Cup champions (women's)

See also 
National League A
Swiss League
Swiss Women’s Hockey League A
List of NLA seasons

External links 
 All-time standings 1909-2008
 Swiss Ice Hockey Association

Ice hockey in Switzerland
Swiss National Ice Hockey Championship
National League (ice hockey)